Běhařovice is a market town in Znojmo District in the South Moravian Region of the Czech Republic. It has about 400 inhabitants.

Administrative parts
Villages of Ratišovice and Stupešice are administrative parts of Běhařovice.

References

Populated places in Znojmo District
Market towns in the Czech Republic